GravyTrain is a 2010 Canadian comedy film directed by April Mullen who also produced the feature with Tim Doiron under the company name G-Train Productions.

Plot
Charles Gravytrain (Tim Doiron) is a policeman in the community of Gypsy Creek, a present-day community whose appearance resembles the 1970s. He and his partner Uma Booma (April Mullen) are attempting to arrest Jimmy Fish Eyes, blamed for the murder of several people including Gravytrain's father. During their quest for justice, Gravytrain and Booma are themselves blamed for the murders and are forced underground until they can escape their frameup. During this time, they become actors in a snuff film produced by Hansel Suppledick (Ryan Tilley).

Cast

Production
The film's 15-day shoot at Niagara Falls, Ontario used Red One camera technology. Many scenes were filmed at the Olde Country Antiques facility whose interiors were suitable for a 1970s-styled set.

The cast includes Alan Frew of the rock band Glass Tiger in his first feature film appearance.

Release
The film is distributed by Alliance Films. It premiered in Toronto on 23 April 2010 and has a limited release schedule in Montreal and Ottawa the following month.

Reception
Initial reviews were mostly negative. Liz Braun of the Toronto Sun declared the production "a cute idea, but it should never have been a movie." The Toronto Star's Bruce DeMara also considered the film a bomb, blasting the production as "wretchedly and resolutely not amusing." The Globe and Mail'''s Liam Lacey also panned the film, deeming the work "at best, a distended TV sketch and at worst like something improvised by middle-school kids with cameras." Norman Wilner of Now considered GravyTrain to be an "empty husk of frantic mugging, pointless 1970s movie references and unearned self-regard." Eye Weekly'' took a somewhat favourable view, noting among other elements the "unexpectedly gorgeous cinematography."

References

External links
 
 
 

2010 films
English-language Canadian films
Canadian crime comedy films
Culture of Niagara Falls, Ontario
Films directed by April Mullen
Films shot in Ontario
2010s English-language films
2010s Canadian films